Altmühltal (lit.: "Altmühl valley") is a Verwaltungsgemeinschaft (federation of municipalities) in the district of Weißenburg-Gunzenhausen in Bavaria in Germany. It consists of the following municipalities:
Alesheim 
Dittenheim
Markt Berolzheim
Meinheim

References

Verwaltungsgemeinschaften in Bavaria
Weißenburg-Gunzenhausen